Queso ice cream, also called keso ice cream or cheese ice cream, is a Filipino ice cream flavor prepared using cheddar cheese. It is one of the most common ice cream flavors of the traditional sorbetes ice cream (usually dyed bright yellow), and is commonly served on with scoops of ube, vanilla, and chocolate ice cream in one cone.

It is also commonly eaten as an ice cream sandwich with pandesal bread rolls, or made with corn kernels (a popular dessert pairing in the Philippines called mais con queso).

See also
Ube ice cream

References

Philippine desserts
Ice cream
Cheese dishes